Dorothy Perkins is an online British women's fashion brand based in the United Kingdom. Formerly a store chain, it sold both its own range of clothes and branded fashion goods until February 2021, when it became part of Boohoo.com, having been acquired after the collapse of Philip Green's fashion empire Arcadia Group.

History 
Founded in 1909 under the name H. P. Newman, the company changed its trading name to Dorothy Perkins in 1919. In the 1960s, Dorothy Perkins was controlled by the Farmer family, who used to own Winster Hosiery. Staff in the branches could expect regular visits from Alan Farmer, whose picture was printed in a booklet handed to new employees. Best known for its lingerie, tights, and sleepwear collections, its other clothes had difficulty competing with the more trendy Lewis Separates, now owned by River Island Clothing Company Ltd, and Peter Robinson.

In the late 1960s, Dorothy Perkins co-funded Biba's expansion into a large boutique on Kensington High Street. From 1970 to 1973 it owned a 70% stake in the business allowing Biba to extend from womenswear into accessories, beauty products, menswear, children's clothing and home goods.

The Burton Group, later known as Arcadia, purchased Dorothy Perkins in 1979.

The Arcadia Group had a training programme, which offered financial incentives to employees to expand their responsibilities and knowledge of company and business affairs.

In 1994, Dorothy Perkins recruited celebrity Helena Christensen as the face of the brand. Yasmin Le Bon later joined Christensen as a face of Dorothy Perkins. In 2012, Khloe, Kourteney and Kim Kardashian launched the Kardashian Kollection with the fashion chain. 
Number of employees in Dorothy Perkins is 673
In July 2020, Arcadia Group, which comprised several brands including the Topshop and Dorothy Perkins fashion chains, had been hit hard by the COVID-19 lockdown and planned 100s of job cuts to minimise costs. As financial difficulties worsened, Arcadia entered administration on 30 November 2020. In February 2021, Boohoo.com announced it was buying the Dorothy Perkins brand from Arcadia (along with the Wallis and Burton brands) for £25.2 million, with the loss of around 2,450 jobs. The website is still trading, managed by Boohoo

References

External links
 Dorothy Perkins website
 Dorothy Perkins - Fashion Fast Forward Singapore
 Dorothy Perkins - fashion fast forward Malaysia

1909 establishments in England
1909 establishments in the United Kingdom
1979 mergers and acquisitions
2021 disestablishments in England
2021 disestablishments in the United Kingdom
2021 mergers and acquisitions
Clothing brands of the United Kingdom
Clothing retailers of England
Clothing companies of England
Clothing companies based in London
Clothing companies established in 1909
Companies established in 1909
Retail companies disestablished in 2021
Retail companies established in 1909
Companies that have entered administration in the United Kingdom
Companies that filed for Chapter 11 bankruptcy in 2019